Silas Wood (September 14, 1769 – March 2, 1847) was a U.S. Representative from New York.

Born in West Hills on Long Island in the Province of New York, Wood pursued classical studies. He graduated from Princeton College in 1789 and during the five succeeding years was a teacher at that institution. He studied law. He was admitted to the bar and commenced practice in Huntington, New York. He was appointed district attorney of Suffolk County in 1818 and 1821.

Wood was elected to the Sixteenth and to the four succeeding Congresses (March 4, 1819 – March 3, 1829). He served as chairman of the Committee on Expenditures in the Department of State (Seventeenth and Eighteenth Congresses). He was an unsuccessful candidate for reelection in 1828 to the Twenty-first Congress. He died in Huntington, New York, March 2, 1847. He was interred in the Old Public Cemetery on Main Street. Silas Wood Sixth Grade Center of South Huntington School District is named after Wood.

Sources

1769 births
1847 deaths
Princeton University alumni
Politicians from Suffolk County, New York
New York (state) National Republicans
19th-century American politicians
New York (state) Democratic-Republicans
Federalist Party members of the United States House of Representatives from New York (state)
Suffolk County district attorneys